Sander Duits (born 29 August 1983) is a Dutch former professional footballer. He played for De Graafschap, FC Omniworld, RKC Waalwijk and Go Ahead Eagles. His favorite position on the field is as a central midfielder.

Club career
Duits started playing football with amateurs SDC Putten and he was soon signed to the youth team of Vitesse. In 1999, De Graafschap picked him up. He made his debut in professional football as a part of the De Graafschap squad in the 2002–03 Eredivisie season, in which De Graafschap relegated. When relegation was a fact, Duits became a regular starter in Frans Adelaar's side. After promoting back to the Eredivisie, and Gert Kruys becoming manager, Duits played less. He was even put in the reserve team for a short period. De Graafschap once again relegated, and Kruys left the club. He was still no regular, as De Graafschap signed players like Joost Volmer and Dave Bus breaking through – both players for his position.

In 2006, his contract expired at the club, and he signed with FC Omniworld. There he became the key player, and Eredivisie clubs began showing their interest in him. Eventually, he signed with RKC Waalwijk for the 2010–11 season. The club had just been relegated from the Eredivisie, and were fighting for a comeback. After RKC had relegated to the Eerste Divisie, Duits announced he wanted to leave the club. On 28 August 2014, he signed a deal two-year deal with Eredivisie side Go Ahead Eagles.

Duits quit professional football in 2017 citing persisting knee problems and returned to childhood club SDC Putten.

Honours

Club
RKC Waalwijk:
Eerste Divisie: 2010–11

References

External links
 RKC Waalwijk.nl 
 Voetbal International profile 

1983 births
Living people
People from Putten
Association football midfielders
Dutch footballers
De Graafschap players
Almere City FC players
RKC Waalwijk players
Go Ahead Eagles players
Eredivisie players
Eerste Divisie players
Footballers from Gelderland
SDC Putten players